The 1992 ITU Triathlon World Championships were held in Huntsville, Canada on September 11 and September 12, 1992.

Results

Men's Championship

Women's Championship

See also
1992 ITU Triathlon World Cup

References
the-sports.org
archive.triathlon.org

World Triathlon Series
World Championships
Triathlon World Championships
1992 ITU Triathlon World Championships
1992 in Ontario
Triathlon competitions in Canada